Lübbenau (officially Lübbenau/Spreewald, L.S. Lubnjow/Błota  (meaning Lübbenau/Spree Forest)) is a town in the Upper Spree Forest-Lusatia District of Brandenburg, Germany. The town is best known through the incorporated villages of Lehde/Lědy and Leipe/Lipje, villages where there just exist anabranches of the Spree River instead of streets.

Administration
The town of Lübbenau consists of (German/Lower Sorbian):
 Lübbenau/Spreewald (Lubnjow/Błota) with Kaupen (Kupy), Neustadt (Nowe Město), Stennewitz (Sćenojce), Stottoff (Štotup), and  Wotschofska (Wótšowska)
and the incorporated villages of:
 Bischdorf (Wótšowc)
 Boblitz (Bobolce)
 Groß Beuchow (Buchow) with Klein Beuchow (Buchojc)
 Groß Klessow (Klěšow) with Klein Klessow (Klěšojc) and Redlitz (Rědłojce)
 Groß Lübbenau (Lubń) with Scheddis (Pśedejs)
 Hindenberg (Želnjojce)
 Klein Radden (Radyńc) with Groß Radden (Radyń)
 Kittlitz (Dłopje) with Eisdorf (Stańšojce), Lichtenau (Lichtnow), and Schönfeld (Tłukom)
 Krimnitz (Kśimnice)
 Lehde (Lědy) with Dolzke (Dolck)
 Leipe (Lipje) with Dubkowmühle (Dubkowy Młyn), Eiche (Duby), Konzaks Horst (Kóńcakojc Wótšow), and Pohlenzschänke (Póleńcowa Kjarcma)
 Ragow (Rogow)
 Zerkwitz (Cerkwica)

History
Lübbenau was first mentioned in a sales document in 1315 but is believed to be much older due to excavations below the castle that show settlement from the 8th or 9th century.

From 1364 to 1635, Lübbenau was part of the Kingdom of Bohemia, and then until 1815 Lübbenau was a part of the Electorate of Saxony.  From 1815 to 1947, Lübbenau was part of the Prussian Province of Brandenburg. From 1952 to 1990, it was part of the Bezirk Cottbus of East Germany.

Demography

Sights

Lübbenau offers a variety of sights. Departing from the old town center, visitors can explore the marina with its traditional boats, or a castle which set in a nicely arranged park, including an orangerie with a cafe and a hotel. There are cycling routes to nearby villages, and boat rides are popular with tourists. The city wall's history dates back to the Middle Ages and the museum next to the city gate offers insights into the architecture as well as the rich history of the region.

Twin towns – sister cities

Lübbenau is twinned with:

 Halluin, France
 Kočevje, Slovenia
 Nowogród Bobrzański, Poland
 Oer-Erkenschwick, Germany
 Pniewy, Poland
 Świdnica, Poland

Notable people

Romy Müller (born 1958), track and field athlete and Olympic champion
Jens Riewa (born 1963), presenter and newscaster of the Tagesschau

Associated with the town
Ehm Welk (1884–1966), writer, lived for a time in Lübbenau
Nico (1938–1988), civil Christa Päffgen, model and singer, lived as a child in Lübbenau
Marc Huster (born 1970), weight lifter, grew up in Lübbenau

References

External links

Populated places in Oberspreewald-Lausitz